Khavar may refer to:

Places in Iran
Khavar Shahr
Khavar-e Pain
Khavar-e Seyyed Khalaf

Other uses 
 Kabar, a Turkic ethnic group
 Khavar (newspaper), an Iranian newspaper

See also 
 
 
 Khwar (disambiguation)
 Khuwar (disambiguation)